The Prince G-series engine was the company's only straight-four and straight-six engines which began production in 1955. A number of variations were made, with both OHV and OHC heads. The G series was used in the Skyline, the Laurel, and the Gloria from the 1950s to the early 1970s.

Note that, prior to its merger with Prince, Nissan also made a G series of engines. These are unrelated engines and are documented at the Nissan G engine page.

The source of the listed information is the corresponding article at Japanese Wikipedia.

Flat-2
In 1956, Prince developed a flat-2 engine, the FG2D, for their DPSK (later CPSK) concept car. It displaced 601 cc and produced . The engine suffered excessive vibration and noise issues and was replaced with the FG4C engine.

Flat-4
Prince developed the FG4C, a flat-four displacing 599 cc and producing , as a replacement for the FG2D. The FG4C was used in the 1957 CPSK concept.

Straight-4

FG4A-10
 diameter X stroke: , OHV

Maximum output (gross)  @ 4000 rpm
Maximum torque (gross)  @ 2000 rpm
1952-1955 Prince Sedan AISH
1952-1954 Prince Truck AFTF

FG4A-20
 diameter X stroke: , OHV

Maximum output (gross)  @ 4000 rpm
Maximum torque (gross)  @ 2000 rpm
1955-1956 Prince AIPC-1
1955-1956 Prince AIVE-1
1955-1957 Prince Sedan AISH
1955-1956 Prince Truck AFTF
1955-1956 Prince Truck AKTG
1956 Prince BNSJ concept (increased to 1.9L)

FG4A-30
 diameter X stroke: , OHV

Maximum output (gross)  @ 4000 rpm
Maximum torque (gross)  @ 2000 rpm
Renamed GA-30 in 1958

Applications:
1957 Prince AIPC-2
1957 Prince AIVE-2
1957 Prince Sedan AISH-6
1957 Prince Truck AFTF-8
1957 Prince Miler AOTH-1
1957 Prince Miler AOVH-1
1957 Prince ALPE-1
1957 Prince ALVG-1
1957 Prince AKTG-4

GA-30
 diameter X stroke: , OHV

Maximum output (gross)  @ 4400 rpm
Maximum torque (gross)  @ 3200 rpm
 1957 Prince Skyline ALSI-1
 1957-1961 Prince Skyline ALSI-2
 1957-1958 Prince Truck ALPE
 1958-1959 Prince Miler ARTH-1 (New Miler)
 1958-1960 Prince Truck AQTI-1

GA-4
 diameter X stroke: , OHV

Maximum output (gross)  @ 4000 rpm
Maximum torque (gross)  @ 2000 rpm
1959 improvement on the GA-30; also known as FG4A-40

Mechanical similarities with engine used in Subaru 1500

Applications:
 1957-1959 Prince Skyway ALVG
 1959-1963 Prince Miler ARTH-2
 1958 Prince Miler Van ARVH-1
 1958-1961 Prince Skyline ALSI-2
 1959-1961 Prince Skyway
 1959 Prince ALPE-2
 1959 Prince ALVG-2
 1960 Prince Truck AQTI-2
 1962-1964 Prince Light Miler T430

GB-30
 diameter X stroke: , OHV

Maximum output (gross)  @ 4800 rpm
Maximum torque (gross)  @ 3600 rpm
Also known as FG4B-30

Applications:
 1957-1961 Prince Miler Van BRVF
 1958 Prince Miler BRTH-1
 1959-1960 Prince Gloria BLSIP-1
 1960-1961 Prince Gloria BLSIP-2
 1962 Prince BQTI-2
 1963 Prince T631

GB-4
 diameter X stroke: , OHV

Maximum output (gross)  @ 4800 rpm
Maximum torque (gross)  @ 3600 rpm
Also known as FG4B-40

Applications:
 1961-1963 Prince Gloria BLSIP-3
 1961-1963 Prince Skyline BLSI-3
 1959-1962 Prince Miler BRTH-2
 1961 Prince Skyline Sport BLRA-3 Coupe & Convertible
 1962 Prince Skyline S21
 1962 Prince BLPE-3
 1962 Prince BLVG-3

G-1

The Prince G-1 was the improved GA-4, and was rated at 1.5 L, but displaced  thanks to an entirely different  bore and stroke. This undersquare arrangement was similar to the designs Nissan licensed from Austin Motor Company, though this is probably coincidental.

Applications:
 1958-1963 Prince Clipper AQTI
 1961-1968 Prince Homer T64/T640
 1962-1965 Prince Miler T430
 1963 Prince Skyway V51A
 1963-1965 Prince Clipper T630
 1963-1967 Prince Skyline S50
 1963-1968 Prince Skyway V51 (renamed as "Nissan Prince Skyline Van" in 1966 after the merger with Nissan)
 1965-1966 Prince Light Miler T440

G-2
The G-2 is a  version used by Prince. It was an improved version of the GB-4 and was introduced in 1962 and was installed in the S40 series Prince Gloria as well as the Clipper and Super Miler commercial vehicles. The G-2 was an OHV design.

Applications:
 1962 Prince Skyway P23/V23
 1962-1965 Prince Gloria S40
 1962-1965 Prince Super Miler T431
 1963 Prince 1900 Sprint concept
 1963-1967 Prince Clipper T631
 1964-1967 Prince Super Miler T441
 1965 Prince T65

G-15
The SOHC G-15 was a  engine produced in 1967 for the Skyline. With a crossflow cylinder head, a V-shaped canted valve arrangement and a multi-spherical combustion chamber design, the G-15 was the most technologically advanced Japanese car engine of its day, eclipsing even Nissan's L series engine in their design. The Nissan G engine was not related to the Prince engine; the Nissan version was OHV and slightly smaller displacement.

Applications:
 1967 Prince Skyline S57
 1968-1972 Nissan Skyline 1500 (C10)

G-16
 inside diameter x stroke:   mmin, SOHC

maximum output (gross)  @ 6000 rpm
Maximum torque (gross)  @ 4000 rpm

The G-15 was bored out  to form the G-16. Adapting the engine to more stringent US emissions was deemed too expensive, and it was replaced by the L16 engine in 1975.

Applications:
 1972-1975 Nissan Skyline 1600 (C110)

G-18
Its  bore was the largest in the range, and the  stroke gave it good oversquare dimensions.

This engine was discontinued in 1975 due to tightening emission regulations and replaced with the L18.

Applications:
 1968-1972 Nissan Skyline 1800 (PC10)
 1968-1972 Nissan Laurel C30
 1972-1975 Nissan Skyline 1800 (PC110)
 1972-1975 Nissan Laurel C130

G-20

 inside diameter x stroke: , SOHC

Twin Barrel single Carburetor
compression ratio 8.3:1
maximum output (gross)  @ 5600 rpm
maximum torque (gross)  @ 3200 rpm

Twin SU carburetor regular gasoline
compression ratio 8.3:1
maximum output (gross)  @ 5800 rpm
maximum torque (gross)  @ 3600 rpm

Twin SU carburetor high octane gasoline
compression ratio 9.7:1
maximum output (gross)  @ 5800 rpm
maximum torque (gross)  @ 3600 rpm

This engine was only used in the 1968-1975 C30 & C130 Laurel, and was discontinued in 1975 due to tightening emission regulations.

Straight-6

Prince used a straight-6 version of the G family in their famous Skyline cars. All of the Prince straight-6 engines used single overhead cam heads. Engine displacement was kept below 2000cc to limit the amount of Road tax to be paid yearly in addition to other Japanese Government mandated expenses.

G-7

The G-7 is a straight-6 version displacing . It was the engine of the GT-model Prince Skylines and was an OHC engine unlike the mainly-OHV family that spawned it. It was influenced by the Mercedes-Benz M180 straight six engine. The intake and exhaust manifolds are on the left side of the engine because Japanese drivers sit on the right side and the steering column would interfere, while the Mercedes-Benz engine places the intake and exhaust on the right side due to left hand driving conditions.

Applications:
 1963-1967 Prince Gloria S41
 1965-1968 Prince Skyline 2000 GT-A S54AE
 1965-1968 Prince Skyline 2000 GT-B S54BE (3 Weber 40 DCOE carburetors)
 1967-1969 Nissan (Prince) Gloria PA30

G7B-R

 inside diameter x stroke: 

An improvement on the G7 using a cross-flow cylinder head and was converted into racing use during 1965 - 1966 in the S54 Skyline GT used for racing. Was not commercially available.

GR-8

 inside diameter x stroke: , DOHC
compression ratio 11.0:1
maximum output (gross) more than  @ 8400 rpm
maximum torque (gross)  @ 6400 rpm

Racing engine used in the Prince R380 and Nissan R380-II, based on the G7 engine. The GR-8 used in the R380-III featured mechanical fuel injection.

The Nissan S20 engine was derived from the GR-8.

G-11

The G-11 is another straight-6 OHC version, displacing .

Applications:
 1964-1967 Prince Grand Gloria S44P

See also
 List of Nissan engines
 Nissan G engine

References

G
Straight-four engines
Straight-six engines
Gasoline engines by model